Bahla Club is an Omani sports club based in Bahla. The club is currently playing in the First Division League of Oman Football Association.

References

External links
Bahla Club Profile at Soccerway.com
Bahla Club Profile at Goalzz.com

Football clubs in Oman
Omani League
Bahla
Association football clubs established in 1971
1971 establishments in Oman